4-Amino-2-methyl-1-naphthol is a menadione analog. Its hydrochloride (HCl) salt is often called vitamin K5. The HCl salt has been used as a medicine for vitamin K deficiency under tradenames such as Synkamin, which was sold by Parke-Davis, but has since been discontinued.

Vitamin K function of the compound was first noted in 1940.

Oral lethal dose for the HCl salt in rats is 0.7 g/kg.

Uses
4-Amino-2-methyl-1-naphthol HCl salt is a vitamin K and prevents bleeding caused by vitamin K deficiency when given via intravenous or intramuscular injections at doses of about 1–3 mg. HCl salt is water-soluble and its parenteral administration requires no emulsifiers unlike fat-soluble phylloquinone for example, which is often in formulations with lecithin or glycocholic acid. Parenterally given 1 mg/ml aqueous solutions and orally taken 4 mg tablets of the HCl salt have been available commercially.

Chemistry
4-Amino-2-methyl-1-naphthol HCl salt has a mass of 209.57 g/mol. It darkens at 262 °C and decays without melting at 280–282 °C.

HCl salt breaks down in aqueous solutions via oxidation which is quite fast at neutral pH. First a pink and later a purple precipitant forms. The colored precipitant is (4-oxy-2-methylnaphtylimine)-2-methyl-1,4-naphthoquinone, which is a condensation reaction product of 4-amino-2-methyl-1-naphthol and menadione. Latter is formed via oxidation and deamination of 4-amino-2-methyl-1-naphthol.

4-Amino-2-methyl-1-naphthol can be made from 2-methylnaphthalene or menadione.

Research
4-Amino-2-methyl-1-naphthol HCl salt prevents the growth of different molds and bacteria. Thus it has been studied as potential food preservative.

HCl salt has been studied as a potential treatment for cancer as it prevents glycolysis in cancer cells, which provides them energy for growth.

References

1-Naphthols
Vitamin K
Withdrawn drugs